Take Me Along is a 1959 musical based on the 1933 Eugene O'Neill play Ah, Wilderness, with music and lyrics by Bob Merrill and book by Joseph Stein and Robert Russell.

Background
The idea to musicalize Ah, Wilderness came to David Merrick when George M. Cohan came through St. Louis with the original production of the O'Neill play. (It was rare of Merrick to mention his hometown, as he hated it, and once he refused to fly TWA to the coast because it flew over St. Louis). While producing The Matchmaker in 1955, he began working on Connecticut Summer. Things came to a halt when lyricist/librettist John La Touche died suddenly in 1956 at the age of 41. But in 1957, an adaptation of another O'Neill play, Anna Christie, came to town, called New Girl in Town. Merrick decided to ask the composer, Bob Merrill, to take another stab at it.

Productions
Take Me Along was directed by Peter Glenville with production design by Oliver Smith, lighting by Jean Rosenthal, costumes by Miles White, musical direction and vocal arrangements by Lehman Engel, dances and musical numbers staging by Onna White, ballet and incidental music by Laurence Rosenthal, orchestrations by Philip J. Lang; and was produced by David Merrick. It opened on Broadway at the Shubert Theatre on October 22, 1959  and closed on December 17, 1960 after 448 performances.

A revival opened on Broadway at the Martin Beck Theater in April 1985, closing after 7 previews and 1 regular performance following seven months of successful runs at The Goodspeed Opera House, The Shubert Theatre New Haven, and The Kennedy Center. Kurt Knudson scored a Tony nomination for the role of Sid Davis and Gary Wright received a Theatre World Award nomination for his role as Richard Miller.

The musical opened at the Irish Repertory Theater, New York City, in a limited run, from February 28, 2008 through April 13, 2008.

Use in advertising
In 1967, United Airlines' advertising agency, Leo Burnett, adapted the title song for a massive ad campaign, anchored by promotional films directed by Michael Cimino, who would later become a noted motion picture screenwriter and director.  An urban legend then goes on to say that the ad campaign backfired when United offered a two-for-one "take me along" fare in ads encouraging (male) business travelers to take their wives with them on business trips.  United then sent "thank you" letters to the wives of business travelers who had taken advantage of the promotion.  Unfortunately, many of these wives had not been "taken along" on those trips.  Instead, many husbands had supposedly traveled with their mistresses. In truth, companions were only offered discounts, never freebies.

Original Broadway cast
Sources:
Sid Davis - Jackie Gleason 
Nat Miller - Walter Pidgeon
Essie Miller - Una Merkel
Lily - Eileen Herlie
Art Miller - James Cresson
Richard Miller - Robert Morse
Mildred Miller - Zeme North
Tommy Miller - Luke Halpin
David Macomber - Fred Miller
Muriel Macomber - Susan Luckey
Wint - Peter Conlow
Belle - Arlene Golonka
Bartender - Jack Collins
Salesman - Bill McDonald
Lady Entertainers - Valerie Harper, Diana Hunter, and Rae McLean
The Drunk - Gene Varrone
Beardsley Dwarf - Charles Bolender

Songs
Source:

Act I
 The Parade - Nat Miller and Townspeople
 Oh, Please - Nat Miller, Essie Miller, Lily Miller and Family
 I Would Die - Muriel Macomber and Richard Miller
 Sid, Ol' Kid - Sid Davis and Townspeople
 Staying Young - Nat Miller
 I Get Embarrassed - Sid Davis and Lily Miller
 We're Home - Lily Miller
 Take Me Along - Sid Davis and Nat Miller
 For Sweet Charity - Sid Davis, Nat Miller, Lady Entertainers and Townspeople
 Volunteer Firemen's Picnic - Sid Davis
 Pleasant Beach House - Wint
 That's How It Starts - Richard Miller

Act II
 The Beardsley Ballet - Richard Miller, Muriel Macomber, The Beardsley Dwarf, Salome and Ensemble (In the 1985 revival, "If Jesus Don't Love Ya (Jack Daniels Will)" replaced the Ballet.)
 Oh, Please (Reprise) - Nat Miller and Essie Miller
 Promise Me a Rose - Lily Miller and Sid Davis
 Staying Young (Reprise) - Nat Miller
 Little Green Snake - Sid Davis
 Nine O'Clock - Richard Miller
 But Yours - Sid Davis and Lily Miller
 Take Me Along (Reprise) - Lily Miller, Sid Davis and Townspeople

Knights on White Horses was added for Lily (Beth Fowler) in the 1985 revival.  Volunteer Firemen's Picnic has been borrowed twice by animated TV show Family Guy: first for the episode PTV as The Freakin' FCC. The song then returned for a special appearance at the Emmy Awards as If You Want It You Can Find It On TV, taking potshots at Desperate Housewives, Two and a Half Men and The Sopranos among others.

Awards and nominations

Original Broadway production

References

External links 
 

1959 musicals
Broadway musicals
Musicals based on plays
Tony Award-winning musicals
Adaptations of works by Eugene O'Neill